Robyn Adele Anderson (born February 19, 1989) is an American singer and stage actress based in New York City. She is a cast member and featured artist for Scott Bradlee's Postmodern Jukebox with over 250 million YouTube views on her music videos.  She is credited with the band's breakthrough covers of "Thrift Shop" and "We Can't Stop" in 2013. Anderson also performed lead vocals for performances on Good Morning America (ABC) in 2013, and TEDx in 2014.

Early life and education 
Robyn Adele Anderson was born in Albany, New York. She grew up in Glenmont, New York with her mother, father, and half-sister. She is of German, Dutch, English, Scottish, and Native American descent. She attended Bethlehem Central High School where she played clarinet in the Wind Ensemble and sang in several choral groups.

She graduated from Binghamton University in 2011 with a Bachelors of Arts degree in Political Science and Arabic and concentrations in Middle Eastern Studies and International Affairs. She studied at the University of Seville in Spain for a semester in 2009 and became a study-abroad peer adviser. Her academic accomplishments won her the Israel J. Rosefksy Language and Culture Scholarship and the Chancellor's Award for Student Excellence in 2011. She was also selected as the intern for Binghamton's Planet Library project, an internationalization effort.

Career 
From 2012 to 2015, Anderson worked for the ANSOB Center for Refugees, a non-profit organization in Astoria, NY that assists refugees in obtaining legal and social services.

In February 2013, Anderson began collaborating with American pianist and musical arranger Scott Bradlee. Anderson became a founding member of Postmodern Jukebox led by American pianist and arranger Scott Bradlee. In 2013, Anderson's vocal contributions to the Postmodern Jukebox cover of Macklemore & Ryan Lewis' "Thrift Shop" (2012) helped the video receive one million views on YouTube in its first week and four million in its first year.

After serving as Postmodern Jukebox' primary vocalist, Anderson started producing music under her own name. The music was released on YouTube and other platforms. As of August 2021, her YouTube channel has over 653,000 subscribers and over 84 million views. 

In January 2014, she became a staff writer for the online K-pop magazine KpopStarz. 

In 2015, she was cast as Lilyan Tashman in Cynthia von Buhler's Speakeasy Dollhouse: Ziegfeld's Midnight Frolic at the Liberty Theatre. 

In 2016, she played the part of Lucile in FlexCo.'s production of The Flying Doctor at the Central Booking Art Space in the Lower East Side. Occasionally she is a guest vocalist for the musical duo The Skivvies, composed of Lauren Molina and Nick Cearley.

In 2017, Anderson began a series of solo shows, first at Feinstein's/54 Below followed by several at Sleep No More's Manderley Bar, and a two-week tour in 2018 alongside Von Smith.

Anderson voiced the character Robin Koninsky (a Polish singer) in the 2018 video game Red Dead Redemption 2. Other members of Postmodern Jukebox also made appearances. In the same year, Robyn Adele (Vol 1.) was released on Bandcamp.

Discography

Solo 
 Vol. 1 (2018)
 Vol. 2 (2019)
 Vol. 3 (2019)
 Vol. 4 (2019) 
 Platinium Collection - EP (2019, Vinyl)
 Vol. 5 (2020)
 OMG I Love Jazz (2020)
 Vol. 6 (2021)
 A Very Vintage Christmas - EP (CD)

As member of Postmodern Jukebox 
 Introducing Postmodern Jukebox (2013)
 Twist is the New Twerk (2014)
 Clubbin' with Grandpa (2014)
 Selfies on Kodachrome (2015)

Postmodern Jukebox videography 
As of December 12, 2016, music videos featuring Anderson account for over 200 million of Postmodern Jukebox' 1 billion+ total YouTube viewcount.

She also appears performing backup vocals on at least one video with Postmodern Jukebox:

"Rude - Vintage 1950s Sock Hop - Style MAGIC! Cover ft. Von Smith" published July 15, 2014
 TEDx Talks: "A bizarro world of pop music | Postmodern Jukebox | TEDxFoggyBottom"
Good Morning America (ABC)

References

External links 

1989 births
Living people
American stage actresses
American women pop singers
Singers from New York (state)
American musical theatre actresses
21st-century American actresses
Binghamton University alumni
21st-century American women singers
21st-century American singers
American people of German descent
American people of English descent
American people of Dutch descent
American people of Scottish descent
American people who self-identify as being of Native American descent